The Hard Word (released in some regions as The Australian Job) is a 2002 Australian crime film about three bank-robbing brothers who are offered a role in a bold heist while serving time in prison. The film was written and directed by Scott Roberts, and stars Guy Pearce and Rachel Griffiths.

Plot
The plot centers around three brothers, sophisticated armed robbers led by the shrewd Dale who work with their long-time lawyer, Frank and corrupt police to pull off the biggest heist in Australian history. Matters become complicated when Dale begins to realize that while he's been in jail his wife, Carol has been sleeping with Frank, who has schemes of his own.

The major heist is a reworking of the 1976 Great Bookie Robbery, with a number of variations, including the murders of several people.

Box office
The Hard Word grossed $2,957,456 at the box office in Australia.

Butcher talk
A few times Butcher talk ("Rechtub klat") is spoken. At those times hard coded subtitles are used.

References

External links
 

2002 films
2000s crime comedy films
2002 black comedy films
2000s heist films
Adultery in films
Australian black comedy films
Films about brothers
Films set in Australia
Films set in prison
Films shot in Melbourne
Films shot in Sydney
Australian crime comedy films
2002 comedy films
2000s English-language films